Bothrops fonsecai, or Fonseca's lancehead, is a species of venomous snake in the  family Viperidae. The species is endemic to Brazil.

Etymology
The specific name, fonsecai, is in honor of Dr. Flavio da Fonseca, who was head of the laboratory of parasitology at the Instituto Butantan in São Paulo, Brazil.

Geographic range
B. fonsecai is found in Brazil in the states of Minas Gerais, Rio de Janeiro, and São Paulo.

References

Further reading
Hoge RA, Belluomini HE (1959). "Uma nova espécie de Bothrops do Brasil (Serpentes) ". Memórias do Instituto Butantan 28: 195–206. (Bothrops fonsecai, new species). (in Portuguese).

fonsecai
Endemic fauna of Brazil
Reptiles described in 1959